English singer Pixie Lott has released three studio albums, one compilation album, two extended plays, 16 singles (including three as a featured artist), one promotional single and 18 music videos. Turn It Up, Lott's debut studio album, was released in September 2009 by Mercury Records to commercial success. It peaked at number six on the UK Albums Chart and was certified double Platinum by the British Phonographic Industry (BPI). Turn It Up spawned the UK number-one singles "Mama Do (Uh Oh, Uh Oh)" and "Boys and Girls", alongside the top 20 entries "Cry Me Out", "Gravity" and "Turn It Up". Later reissued as Turn It Up Louder in October 2010, the record encompassed "Broken Arrow", which achieved similar success.

Young Foolish Happy, Lott's second studio album, was released in November 2011, reaching number 18 in the United Kingdom. Its lead single, "All About Tonight", became the singer's third number one on the UK Singles Chart, while subsequent singles "What Do You Take Me For" and "Kiss the Stars" both reached the top 10 in the territory. In August 2014, Lott released her eponymous studio album to moderate commercial success.

Albums

Studio albums

Compilation albums

Extended plays

Singles

As lead artist

As featured artist

Promotional singles

Other charted songs

Guest appearances

Songwriting credits

Music videos

Notes

References

External links
 
 
 

Discographies of British artists
Pop music discographies
Rhythm and blues discographies